Skipwith is an unincorporated community in old Bluestone Township, Mecklenburg County, Virginia, United States. It is located between Chase City and Clarksville, west-northwest of the county seat at Boydton. The community was named for local members of the Skipwith family, related to colonial Virginia Skipwith families which began arriving from English baronial estates in the 1650s. The surname Skipwith is derived from Old English "sceap" (sheep) and Old Norse "vath" (ford or wading place). One ancient Skipwith coat of arms is blazoned "Argent, three bars Gules, in chief a greyhound courant Sable."

History
Red Fox Farm was listed on the National Register of Historic Places in 1993.

Geography and climate
Skipwith is located at  (36.6943070, −78.4908321). Skipwith is 139 meters (456 feet) above sea level.

Skipwith lies in the Piedmont area of Virginia and has a humid sub-tropical climate generalized by hot, humid summers and cool to chilly winters. The average annual rainfall is 42.7 inches with winter-time snowfall averaging 3.5 inches.

Demographics
The ZIP Code Tabulation Area (ZCTA) for Skipwith ZIP Code, 23968, had an estimated population of 912 in the year 2000, and rose to 1,057 in the year 2010.

Education
Skipwith is the site of the Bluestone High School "Barons" (1955-2022) and the Bluestone Middle School "Trojans."

References

Sources
 https://www.census.gov/census2000/states/va.html
 http://geonames.usgs.gov/ Feature Detail Report for Skipwith

External links
 Bluestone Middle School, Skipwith
 Bluestone Senior High School, Skipwith

Unincorporated communities in Mecklenburg County, Virginia